State Highway 57 in Uttar Pradesh is an approximately 170.3 km long highway from Delhi to Saharanpur.

State Highways in Uttar Pradesh